Masan Group Corporation,, is among the top three  largest private sector companies in Vietnam in terms of market capitalization.
The group was founded and is headquartered in Ho Chi Minh city. Its subsidiaries include Masan Food (consumer staples), Techcombank (financial services) and Masan Resources (mining). The group launched on the Ho Chi Minh Stock Exchange on 5 November 2009.

Masan Group was among the first domestic Vietnamese corporations to adopt a growth strategy that taps foreign sources of capital for acquisition-driven expansion. In April 2011, the group's subsidiary Masan Consumer Corp. became the recipient of Vietnam's largest private-equity investment when KKR paid US$159 million for a 10% stake in the company.  This investment was viewed as a validation of Vietnam's M&A potential.

The company was founded by its chairman, Nguyen Dang Quang, who following a doubling of the share price in the six months to January 2018, had a net worth of US$1.2 billion.

In December 2019, Masan Group acquired a controlling stake in VinGroup's retail division VinCommerce, which operates under the VinMart brand.

References

External link 
 
Vietnamese companies established in 1996
Companies based in Ho Chi Minh City
Conglomerate companies established in 1996